is a Japanese footballer. He is a goalkeeper.

He signed for Albirex Niigata (S) after graduating from Yamanashi Gakuin University.

Club career statistics
As of Oct 1, 2020

External links

References

1994 births
Living people
Japanese footballers
Singapore Premier League players
Albirex Niigata Singapore FC players
Association football goalkeepers
Yamanashi Gakuin University alumni